Sharon Memorial Park is a Jewish cemetery located in Sharon, Massachusetts. This memorial park was established in 1948, the same year as the formation of Israel, it is situated on 317 acres of land within the towns of Sharon and Canton.

Notable interments
 Irving Fine (1914–1962), composer and conductor
 Richard Frank (1953–1995), actor
 Elizabeth Glaser (1947–1994), AIDS activist and former wife of actor Paul Michael Glaser
 Melvin J. Glimcher
 Edith Fishtine Helman (1905–1994), professor at Simmons College
 Minuetta Kessler (1914–2002), concert pianist, classical music composer, and educator
 Simon Kuznets (1901–1985), Nobel Prize recipient
 Daniel Lewin (1970–2001), entrepreneur who co-founded Akamai Technologies and September 11 attacks victim
 Sumner Redstone (1923–2020), businessman (ViacomCBS)
 William Rosenberg (1916–2002), founder of Dunkin' Donuts
 Mark Sandman (1952–1999), rock musician and songwriter

 Ruth Wallis (1920–2007), cabaret singer

References

External links
 Sharon Memorial Park
 

1948 establishments in Massachusetts
Cemeteries in Norfolk County, Massachusetts
Jewish cemeteries in Massachusetts
Jewish cemeteries in the United States
Cemeteries established in the 1940s